The Arizona State Sun Devils women's beach volleyball team represents Arizona State University in the sport of beach volleyball. The Sun Devils compete in Division I of the National Collegiate Athletics Association (NCAA) and the Pac-12 Conference. ASU is currently one of nine schools to play beach volleyball in the Pac-12 Conference, along with Arizona, Californialifornia, Stanford, Oregon, UCLA, USC, Utah and Washington.

History
Arizona State University began their sand volleyball program in 2014. It officially became an NCAA Championship sport in 2016, as they changed the sport's name to beach volleyball. In their first four seasons, the Arizona State Sun Devils have had three head coaches. Jason Watson led ASU for two seasons from 2014 to 2015, Jackie Bunker for one season in 2016, and Brad Keenan starting in 2017.

Year-by-year results

Sources:

2014 Season summary
During their inaugural season in 2014, the Sand Devils finished (6–4) overall under Head Coach Jason Watson. Jackie Bunker was an Assistant Coach. The 2014 team included: (Bianca Arellano, BreElle Bailey, Mercedes Binns, Jordy Checkal, Whitney Follette, Macey Gardner, Kwyn Johnson, Bethany Jorgensen, Andi Lowrance, Mia Mazon, Shannon McCready, Genevieve Pirotte, Kizzy Willey-Ricedorff, and Nora Tuioti-Mariner).

Season results
March 8, 2014 vs Arizona Christian at Arizona Invitational in Tucson, Arizona W 5-0
March 8, 2014 at Arizona at Arizona Invitational in Tucson, Arizona L 4-1
March 14, 2014 vs Tulane at Wildcat Spring Challenge in Tucson, Arizona W 3-2
March 15, 2014 vs Arizona Christian at Wildcat Spring Challenge in Tucson, Arizona W 5-0
March 26, 2014 vs Nebraska at PERA Club in Tempe, Arizona L 3-2
April 19, 2014 vs Cal State Bakersfield at Pac-12 Tournament in Santa Monica, California L 4-1
April 19, 2014 vs Arizona at Pac-12 Tournament in Santa Monica, California W 3-2
April 19, 2014 vs USC at Pac-12 Tournament in Santa Monica, California L 5-0
April 24, 2014 vs Arizona at PERA Club in Tempe, Arizona  W 3-2
April 25, 2014 vs Boise State AT PERA Club in Tempe, Arizona W 5-0

2015 Season summary
The Sun Devils completed the 2015 campaign (7–13) overall under Head Coach Jason Watson. Jackie Bunker was an Assistant Coach and Deb Rose was a Volunteer Assistant Coach. The 2015 team included: (Bianca Arellano, BreElle Bailey, Madison Berridge, Mercedes Binns, Jordy Checkal, Whitney Follette, Macey Gardner, Frances Giedraitis, Halle Harker, Kwyn Johnson, Genevieve Pirotte, Bethany Jorgensen, Andi Lowrance, Mia Mazon, Sydney Palmer, Kizzy Willey-Ricedorff, Mia Rivera, and Blair Robalin).

Season results
March 6, 2015 vs Tulane at Arizona Invitational in Tucson, Arizona L 3-2
March 6, 2015 vs LSU at Arizona Invitational in Tucson, Arizona L 4-1
March 7, 2015 vs TCU at Arizona Invitational in Tucson, Arizona W 5-0
March 20, 2015 vs Florida State at South Carolina Invitational in Columbia, SC L 4-1
March 20, 2015 at South Carolina at South Carolina Invitational in Columbia, SC L 4-1
March 21, 2015 vs Georgia State at South Carolina Invitational in Columbia, SC L 4-1
March 21, 2015 vs Carson-Newman at South Carolina Invitational in Columbia, SC W 5-0
March 22, 2015 vs Tulane at South Carolina Invitational in Columbia, SC L 3-2
March 25, 2015 vs Nebraska at PERA Club in Tempe, Arizona L 3-2
March 26, 2015 vs Boise State at PERA Club in Tempe, Arizona W 3-2
March 28, 2015 vs USC at PERA Club in Tempe, Arizona L 5-0
March 28, 2015 vs New Mexico at PERA Club in Tempe, Arizona W 5-0
April 10, 2015 vs Arizona in ASU Sand Volleyball Challenge at PERA Club in Tempe, Arizona L 4-1
April 11, 2015 vs New Mexico in ASU Sand Volleyball Challenge at PERA Club in Tempe, Arizona W 4-1
April 11, 2015 vs Cal State Bakersfield in ASU Sand Volleyball Challenge at PERA Club in Tempe, Arizona L 3-2
April 18, 2015 vs California at Pac-12 Tournament in Santa Monica, California W 4-1
April 18, 2015 vs USC at Pac-12 Tournament in Santa Monica, California L 4-1
April 18, 2015 vs UCLA at Pac-12 Tournament in Santa Monica, California W 3-2
April 18, 2015 vs Arizona at Pac-12 Tournament in Santa Monica, California L 3-2
April 22, 2015 at Arizona in Tucson, Arizona  L 4-1

2016 Season summary
ASU finished the 2016 season (12–13) overall under Head Coach Jackie Bunker. Deb Rose was an Assistant Coach. The 2016 team included: (Bianca Arellano, Madison Berridge, Natalie Braun, Whitney Follette, Frances Giedraitis, Kwyn Johnson, Sydney Palmer, Jourdan Parnell, Californiassidy Pickrell, Kylie Pickrell, Logan Rae, Mia Rivera, Blair Robalin, and Bethany Wedepohl).

Awards
Bianca Arellano was named Pac-12 All-Conference 1st Team and earned Pac-12 All-Academic 1st Team
Whitney Follette earned Pac-12 All-Conference 1st Team and was named Pac-12 All-Academic Honorable Mention
Frances Giedraitis was named Pac-12 All-Academic 1st Team
Kwyn Johnson received Pac-12 All-Academic 1st Team
Sydney Palmer was named Pac-12 All-Academic Honorable Mention
Mia Rivera earned Pac-12 All-Academic 2nd Team
Genevieve Pirotte earned Pac-12 All-Academic 2nd Team

Season results
March 4, 2016  vs New Mexico in Sun Devil Challenge at PERA Club in Tempe, Arizona  L 3-2
March 4, 2016  vs # 6 Florida State in Sun Devil Challenge at PERA Club in Tempe, Arizona  L 5-0
March 5, 2016  vs Colorado Mesa in Sun Devil Challenge at PERA Club in Tempe, Arizona  W 5-0
March 5, 2016  vs # 17 South Carolina in Sun Devil Challenge at PERA Club in Tempe, Arizona  W 4-1
March 10, 2016  at Loyola Marymount in Los Angeles, California  W 5-0
March 10, 2016  at # 2 USC in Los Angeles, California  L 5-0
March 11, 2016  at # 4 Long Beach State in Long Beach, California  L 4-1
March 18, 2016  vs Colorado Mesa at UNM Spring Beach Tournament in Albuquerque, New Mexico  W 4-1
March 19, 2016  vs New Mexico State at UNM Spring Beach Tournament in Albuquerque, New Mexico  W 5-0
March 19, 2016  at New Mexico at UNM Spring Beach Tournament in Albuquerque, New Mexico  L 4-1
March 25, 2016  vs Cal State Bakersfield at Wildcat Spring Challenge in Tucson, Arizona  W 4-1
March 25, 2016  vs Cal State Northridge at Wildcat Spring Challenge in Tucson, Arizona  W 5-0
April 2, 2016  at # 4 Hawaii at Outrigger Beach VB Challenge in Honolulu, Hawaii  L 5-0
April 2, 2016  vs # 5 UCLA at Outrigger Beach VB Challenge in Honolulu, Hawaii  L 5-0
April 9, 2016  vs Oregon at Stanford Tournament in Palo Alto, California  W 3-2
April 9, 2016  at Stanford at Stanford Tournament in Palo Alto, California  L 3-2
April 10, 2016  vs Boise State at Stanford Tournament in Palo Alto, California  W 3-2
April 10, 2016  vs # 16 California at Stanford Tournament in Palo Alto, California  L 4-1
April 14, 2016  at Arizona in Tucson, Arizona  L 4-1
April 16, 2016  vs San Diego State at PERA Club in Tempe, Arizona  W 5-0
April 16, 2016  vs Grossmont College at PERA Club in Tempe, Arizona  W 5-0
April 20, 2016  vs Arizona at PERA Club in Tempe, Arizona  L 4-1
April 29, 2016  vs California at Pac-12 Tournament in Los Angeles, California  L 3-2
April 30, 2016  vs Oregon at Pac-12 Tournament in Los Angeles, California  W 3-2
April 30, 2016  vs Arizona at Pac-12 Tournament in Los Angeles, California  L 5-0

2017 Season summary
The Sun Devils completed the 2017 campaign (16–16) overall under Head Coach Brad Keenan. ASU entered the AVCA Beach Volleyball poll for the first time in school history, reaching as high as # 10. The Maroon and Gold was ranked in five of the eleven weeks for the AVCA poll. Arizona State finished (5–2) at home, (4–3) on the road, (7–11) in neutral site contests, and (2–12) against ranked opponents. The 2017 team included: (Bianca Arellano, Madison Berridge, Natalie Braun, Katelyn Carballo, Katie Cross, Whitney Follette, Frances Giedraitis, Kwyn Johnson, Ellyson Lundberg, Oluoma Okaro, Sydney Palmer, Jourdan Parnell, Sage Patchell, Californiassidy Pickrell, Mia Rivera, Bethany Wedepohl, and Kara Woodard).

Awards
Bianca Arellano was named Pac-12 All-Conference 1st Team and earned Pac-12 All-Academic 1st Team
Whitney Follette earned Pac-12 All-Conference 1st Team and received Pac-12 All-Academic 1st Team
Kwyn Johnson claimed Pac-12 All-Academic 1st Team
Genevieve Pirotte was awarded Pac-12 All-Academic 2nd Team
Oluoma Okaro received Pac-12 All-Conference 2nd Team
Cassidy Pickrell earned Pac-12 All-Academic 1st Team
Mia Rivera was awarded Pac-12 All-Academic 2nd Team

Season results
March 3, 2017  vs # 5 Hawaii at Arizona Invitational in Tucson, Arizona  L 4-1
March 3, 2017  vs Jacksonville at Arizona Invitational in Tucson, Arizona  W 4-1
March 4, 2017  at # 6 Arizona at Arizona Invitational in Tucson, Arizona  W 3-2
March 11, 2017  vs # 8 Arizona in Sun Devil Challenge at PERA Club in Tempe, Arizona  L 3-2
March 12, 2017  vs New Mexico in Sun Devil Challenge at PERA Club in Tempe, Arizona  W 3-2
March 12, 2017  vs Texas A&M Kingsville in Sun Devil Challenge at PERA Club in Tempe, Arizona  W 5-0
March 17, 2017  at Cal State Bakersfield in Bakersfield, California  W 5-0
March 18, 2017  vs TCU at Zuma Classic in Malibu, California  L 3-2
March 18, 2017  at # 2 Pepperdine at Zuma Classic in Malibu, California  L 5-0
March 18, 2017  vs Cal State Los Angeles at Zuma Classic in Malibu, California  W 5-0
March 23, 2017  vs Nebraska at PERA Club in Tempe, Arizona  L 3-2
March 24, 2017  at TCU at Horned Frog Challenge in Fort Worth, Texas  W 3-2
March 24, 2017  vs # 8 LSU at Horned Frog Challenge in Fort Worth, Texas  L 3-2
March 25, 2017  vs # 8 LSU at Horned Frog Challenge in Fort Worth, Texas  L 4-1
March 31, 2017  vs # 3 UCLA at FIU Surf & Turf Invitational in Miami, Florida  L 5-0
March 31, 2017  vs # 18 Tulane at FIU Surf & Turf Invitational in Miami, Florida  L 4-1
March 31, 2017  at # 15 Florida International at FIU Surf & Turf Invitational in Miami, Florida  L 4-1
April 1, 2017  vs New Orleans at FIU Surf & Turf Invitational in Miami, Florida  W 4-1
April 1, 2017  vs # 14 Florida Atlantic at FIU Surf & Turf Invitational in Miami, Florida  W 3-2
April 1, 2017  vs # 4 Florida State at FIU Surf & Turf Invitational in Miami, Florida  L 5-0
April 7, 2017  at # 1 USC in Los Angeles, California  L 5-0
April 8, 2017  vs St. Mary's California at USAV Beach Collegiate Challenge in Manhattan Beach, California  W 3-2
April 8, 2017  vs # 1 USC at USAV Beach Collegiate Challenge in Manhattan Beach, California  L 4-1
April 8, 2017  vs Loyola Marymount at USAV Beach Collegiate Challenge in Manhattan Beach, California  L 4-1
April 14, 2017  vs Concordia-Irvine in Northridge, California  W 5-0
April 14, 2017  at Cal State Northridge in Northridge, California  W 3-2
April 21, 2017  vs New Mexico at PERA Club in Tempe, Arizona  W 4-1
April 21, 2017  vs California at PERA Club in Tempe, Arizona  W 3-2
April 22, 2017  vs Stanford at PERA Club in Tempe, Arizona  W 5-0
April 27, 2017  vs Stanford at Pac-12 Tournament in Tucson, Arizona  W 5-0
April 27, 2017  vs # 1 USC at Pac-12 Tournament in Tucson, Arizona  L 5-0
April 27, 2017  vs Washington at Pac-12 Tournament in Tucson, Arizona  L 3-2

2018 Season summary
With Brad Keenan entering his second season as the Sun Devils Head Coach, Arizona State finished the 2018 campaign with an (11–20) record. ASU completed the season (2–4) at home, (2–4) on the road, (7–12) in neutral site contests, and (2–16) against ranked opponents. Kristal Harris was an Assistant Coach and Ryan Wrublik was a Volunteer Assistant Coach. The 2018 roster included: (Bailey Anderson, Kate Baldwin, Natalie Braun, Katelyn Carballo, Katie Cross, Sierra Ellett, Cierra Flood, Frances Giedraitis, Halle Harker, Kwyn Johnson, Ellyson Lundberg, Sydney Palmer, Jourdan Parnell, Samantha Plaster, Mia Rivera, Californiassidy Schilling, and Kara Woodard).

Awards
Frances Giedraitis received 1st Team All-Academic Pac-12 honors
Kwyn Johnson earned 1st Team All-Academic Pac-12 honors
Ellyson Lundberg claimed 1st Team All-Academic Pac-12 honors
Katie Cross received 2nd Team All-Academic Pac-12 honors
Katelyn Carballo earned Honorable Mention All-Academic Pac-12 honors
Mia Rivera claimed Honorable Mention All-Academic Pac-12 honors

Season results
February 24, 2018 vs # 1 USC at PERA Club in Tempe, Arizona  L 3-2
February 25, 2018 vs Nebraska at PERA Club in Tempe, Arizona  W 3-2
February 25, 2018 vs # 14 Cal Poly at PERA Club in Tempe, Arizona  L 3-2
March 3, 2018 vs # 8 Cal Poly at TCU Fight in the Fort Tournament in Fort Worth, Texas  L 4-1
March 3, 2018 vs # 18 Tulane at TCU Fight in the Fort Tournament in Fort Worth, Texas  L 5-0  
March 4, 2018 at # 14 TCU at TCU Fight in the Fort Tournament in Fort Worth, Texas  W 4-1
March 9, 2018 vs San Jose State at Stanford Invitational in Palo Alto, California  W 4-1
March 9, 2018 vs California at Stanford Invitational in Palo Alto, California  L 4-1
March 10, 2018 vs # 18 Tulane at Stanford Invitational in Palo Alto, California  L 3-2 
March 10, 2018 at # 14 Stanford at Stanford Invitational in Palo Alto, California  L 3-2
March 24, 2018 vs # 2 UCLA at Pac-12 South Invitational in Santa Monica, California  L 5-0
March 24, 2018 vs # 4 USC at Pac-12 South Invitational in Santa Monica, California  L 4-1
March 25, 2018 vs # 14 Stanford at Pac-12 South Invitational in Santa Monica, California  L 3-2
March 25, 2018 vs # 19 Washington at Pac-12 South Invitational in Santa Monica, California  W 4-1
March 30, 2018 vs Abilene Christian at Lucky 66 Bowl in Albuquerque, New Mexico  W 5-0
March 30, 2018 vs Colorado Mesa at Lucky 66 Bowl in Albuquerque, New Mexico  W 5-0
March 31, 2018 at New Mexico at Lucky 66 Bowl in Albuquerque, New Mexico  W 4-1
March 31, 2018 vs Colorado Mesa at Lucky 66 Bowl in Albuquerque, New Mexico  W 5-0
April 6, 2018 vs # 14 California at Wildcat Spring Challenge in Tucson, Arizona  L 5-0
April 6, 2018 vs Colorado Mesa at Wildcat Spring Challenge in Tucson, Arizona  W 5-0
April 6, 2018 at # 15 Arizona at Wildcat Spring Challenge in Tucson, Arizona  L 4-1
April 7, 2018 vs # 17 Stetson at PERA Club in Tempe, Arizona  L 4-1
April 7, 2018 vs Vanguard at PERA Club in Tempe, Arizona  W 5-0
April 14, 2018 vs Boise State at Senior Celebration in Honolulu, Hawaii  L 3-2
April 14, 2018 at # 3 Hawaii at Senior Celebration in Honolulu, Hawaii  L 5-0
April 15, 2018 vs Boise State at Senior Celebration in Honolulu, Hawaii  L 3-2
April 15, 2018 at # 3 Hawaii at Senior Celebration in Honolulu, Hawaii  L 5-0
April 18, 2018 vs # 14 Arizona at PERA Club in Tempe, Arizona  L 3-2
April 26, 2018 vs # 5 USC at Pac-12 Tournament in Palo Alto, California  L 4-1
April 26, 2018 vs Oregon at Pac-12 Tournament in Palo Alto, California  W 5-0  
April 27, 2018 vs Washington at Pac-12 Tournament in Palo Alto, California  L 4-1

2019 Season summary
ASU completed the 2019 campaign (21–14) overall, setting a school-record for most wins in a single season. Under Head Coach Brad Keenan, the Sun Devils finished (2–6) at home, (2–4) on the road, (17–4) in neutral site contests, and (3–14) against ranked opponents. Ryan Wrublik was an Assistant Coach and Priscilla Tallman was a Volunteer Assistant Coach. The Maroon and Gold earned a spot the AVCA Beach Volleyball poll in the final two weeks, finishing the year ranked # 20. Kate Baldwin and Samantha Plaster set the school record for most career wins as pairs, along with the single season school record for most wins as pairs. The 2019 roster included: (Bailey Anderson, Emily Anderson, Kate Baldwin, Natalie Braun, Kendall Cady, Katelyn Carballo, Katie Cross, Sierra Ellett, Cierra Flood, Halle Johnson, Tabitha Keever, Ellyson Lundberg, Oluoma Okaro, Samantha Plaster, Maddy Salazar, Californiassidy Schilling, Californiarmen Unzue, Lauren Weintraub, Ashley Wenz, and Kara Woodard).

Awards
Kate Baldwin and Samantha Plaster were named to the All-Pac-12 Tournament Team
Oluoma Okaro received Pac-12 All-Conference 1st Team
Ashley Wenz earned Pac-12 All-Conference 2nd Team
Katie Cross claimed Pac-12 All-Academic 1st Team honors
Ellyson Lundberg received Pac-12 All-Academic 1st Team honors
Samantha Plaster earned Pac-12 All-Academic 1st Team honors
Cierra Flood claimed Pac-12 All-Academic 2nd Team honors
Kate Baldwin received Pac-12 All-Academic Honorable Mention honors
Katelyn Carballo earned Pac-12 All-Academic Honorable Mention honors
Oluoma Okaro claimed Pac-12 All-Academic Honorable Mention honors

Season results
February 23, 2019 vs # 15 Loyola Marymount in Phoenix, Arizona  L 5-0
February 23, 2019 at # 16 Grand Canyon in Phoenix, Arizona  W 3-2
February 23, 2019 vs New Mexico in Phoenix, Arizona  W 5-0
March 2, 2019 vs # 1 UCLA at Pac-12 South Invitational in Tucson, Arizona  L 5-0
March 2, 2019 vs # 11 California at Pac-12 South Invitational in Tucson, Arizona  L 5-0
March 3, 2019 vs Washington at Pac-12 South Invitational in Tucson, Arizona  W 5-0
March 8, 2019 vs North Florida at Eckerd College Battle on the Bay in St. Petersburg, Florida  W 5-0
March 8, 2019 vs Florida Gulf Coast at Eckerd College Battle on the Bay in St. Petersburg, Florida  W 4-1
March 9, 2019 vs Tennessee-Martin at Eckerd College Battle on the Bay in St. Petersburg, Florida  W 5-0
March 9, 2019 at Eckerd College at Eckerd College Battle on the Bay in St. Petersburg, Florida  W 5-0
March 15, 2019 vs North Florida in Tucson, Arizona  W 3-2
March 15, 2019 at # 15 Arizona in Tucson, Arizona  L 3-2
March 16, 2019 vs New Mexico in Tucson, Arizona  W 4-1
March 16, 2019 vs Louisiana-Monroe in Tucson, Arizona  W 3-2
March 22, 2019 vs # 2 USC at PERA Club in Tempe, Arizona  L 4-1
March 22, 2019 vs # 6 Hawaii at PERA Club in Tempe, Arizona  L 5-0
March 23, 2019 vs # 5 Pepperdine at PERA Club in Tempe, Arizona  L 3-2
March 23, 2019 vs # 6 Hawaii at PERA Club in Tempe, Arizona  L 4-1
March 29, 2019 vs College of Charleston at Diggin' Duals Tournament in Atlanta, Georgia  W 4-1
March 29, 2019 at # 19 Georgia State at Diggin' Duals Tournament in Atlanta, Georgia  L 4-1
March 29, 2019 vs North Carolina Wilmington at Diggin' Duals in Atlanta, Georgia  W 4-1
March 30, 2019 vs UAB at Diggin' Duals Tournament in Atlanta, Georgia  W 4-1
March 31, 2019 at # 11 South Carolina in Columbia, SC  L 3-2
April 6, 2019 vs Utah at PERA Club in Tempe, Arizona  W 4-1
April 6, 2019 vs # 7 Cal Poly at PERA Club in Tempe, Arizona  L 3-2
April 7, 2019 vs Abilene Christian at PERA Club in Tempe, Arizona  W 5-0
April 7, 2019 vs # 14 Arizona at PERA Club in Tempe, Arizona  L 4-1
April 12, 2019 vs Abilene Christian at Kingsville Beach Bash in Kingsville, Texas  W 5-0
April 12, 2019 at Texas A&M Kingsville at Kingsville Beach Bash in Kingsville, Texas  W 5-0
April 13, 2019 vs Abilene Christian at Kingsville Beach Bash in Kingsville, Texas  W 5-0
April 13, 2019 vs Park University at Kingsville Beach Bash in Kingsville, Texas  W 5-0
April 25, 2019 vs # 10 California at Pac-12 Tournament in Los Angeles, California  W 3-2
April 26, 2019 at # 2 USC at Pac-12 Tournament in Los Angeles, California  L 3-0
April 26, 2019 vs # 20 Stanford at Pac-12 Tournament in Los Angeles, California  W 3-1
April 26, 2019 vs # 10 California at Pac-12 Tournament in Los Angeles, California  L 3-1

2020 Season summary
In their fourth season with Brad Keenan as Head Coach, the Sun Devils finished the 2020 campaign (4-6) overall.  ASU finished (0-0) at home, (0-3) on the road, (4-3) in neutral site contests, and (0-6) against ranked opponents. Ryan Wrublik was an Assistant Coach and Whitney Follette was a Volunteer Assistant Coach.  The Maroon & Gold were ranked in three of the four weeks, while ending the season ranked # 20 in the AVCA Beach Volleyball poll.  The 2020 roster included: (Bailey Anderson, Emily Anderson, Kate Baldwin, Shane Burleson, Kendall Cady, Katelyn Carballo, Monaghan Cromeans, Sierra Ellett, Allyson Eylers, Cierra Flood, Halle Johnson Pasichnuk, Maria Kowal, Ellyson Lundberg, Erin Myers, Samantha Plaster, Maddy Salazar, Matea Suan, Lexi Sweeney, Sarah Waters, Lauren Weintraub, & Kara Woodard).

Awards

Season results
 February 22, 2020 vs San Francisco at Cactus Classic in Tucson, Arizona  W 4-1
 February 22, 2020 vs Boise State at Cactus Classic in Tucson, Arizona  W 5-0
 February 29, 2020 vs # 5 Hawaii in Palo Alto, California  L 5-0
 February 29, 2020 at # 20 Stanford in Palo Alto, California  L 4-1
 March 1, 2020 at # 11 California in Berkeley, California  L 5-0
 March 1, 2020 vs Pacific in Berkeley, California  W 4-1
 March 7, 2020 vs # 2 UCLA at Pac-12 South Invitational in Los Angeles, California L 4-1
 March 7, 2020 vs Utah at Pac-12 South Invitational in Los Angeles, California W 5-0
 March 8, 2020 vs # 11 California at Pac-12 South Invitational in Los Angeles, California L 5-0
 March 8, 2020 vs # 19 Stanford at Pac-12 South Invitational in Los Angeles, California L 3-2
 March 14, 2020 vs North Florida at Carolina Challenge in Columbia, SC: Cancelled due to the COVID-19 pandemic
 March 14, 2020 vs Mercer at Carolina Challenge in Columbia, SC: Cancelled due to the COVID-19 pandemic
 March 15, 2020 vs # 13 Florida International at Carolina Challenge in Columbia, SC: Cancelled due to the COVID-19 pandemic
 March 15, 2020 at # 14 South Carolina at Carolina Challenge in Columbia, SC: Cancelled due to the COVID-19 pandemic
 March 27, 2020 at Texas A&M Corpus Christi at Islanders Classic in Corpus Christi, Texas: Cancelled due to the COVID-19 pandemic
 March 27, 2020 vs Houston Baptist at Islanders Classic in Corpus Christi, Texas: Cancelled due to the COVID-19 pandemic
 March 28, 2020 at Texas A&M Corpus Christi at Islanders Classic in Corpus Christi, Texas: Cancelled due to the COVID-19 pandemic
 March 28, 2020 vs Houston Baptist at Islanders Classic in Corpus Christi, Texas: Cancelled due to the COVID-19 pandemic
 April 1, 2020 vs Long Beach State in Phoenix, Arizona: Cancelled due to the COVID-19 pandemic
 April 4, 2020 in Phoenix, Arizona: Cancelled due to the COVID-19 pandemic
 April 5, 2020 in Phoenix, Arizona: Cancelled due to the COVID-19 pandemic
 April 10, 2020 vs Grand Canyon in Tempe, Arizona: Cancelled due to the COVID-19 pandemic
 April 10, 2020 vs Arizona in Tempe, Arizona: Cancelled due to the COVID-19 pandemic
 April 11, 2020 vs Arizona Christian in Tempe, Arizona: Cancelled due to the COVID-19 pandemic
 April 16, 2020 at Arizona in Tucson, Arizona: Cancelled due to the COVID-19 pandemic
 April 23, 2020 at Pac-12 Tournament in Los Angeles, California: Cancelled due to the COVID-19 pandemic
 April 24, 2020 at Pac-12 Tournament in Los Angeles, California: Cancelled due to the COVID-19 pandemic
 April 25, 2020 at Pac-12 Tournament in Los Angeles, California: Cancelled due to the COVID-19 pandemic

2021 Season summary
In their fifth season under Head Coach Brad Keenan, the Sun Devils finished the 2021 campaign (10-12) overall.  ASU finished (0-1) at home, (2-3) on the road, (8-8) in neutral site contests, and (1-11) against ranked opponents.  Paul Araiza was an Assistant Coach and Katie Cross was a Volunteer Assistant Coach.  The Maroon & Gold were ranked in four of the eleven weeks, reaching as high as # 20 in the AVCA Beach Volleyball poll.  The 2021 roster included: (Taryn Ames, Bailey Anderson, Emily Anderson, Malina Baker, Lila Bordis, Shane Burleson, Katelyn Carballo, Monaghan Cromeans, Sierra Ellett, Kate Fitzgerald, Cierra Flood, Californiambria Hall, Jensen Kaelin, Maria Kowal, Maia Nichols, Samantha Plaster, Maddy Salazar, Aleksandra Sochacka, Lexi Sweeney, Sarah Waters, Ivey Weber, & Lauren Weintraub).

Awards
Samantha Plaster earned Pac-12 Scholar Athlete of the Year
Katelyn Carballo received Pac-12 All-Conference second Team

2021 Season results
February 26, 2021 vs Colorado Mesa at Canyon Classic in Phoenix, Arizona  W 5-0
February 26, 2021 at # 7 Grand Canyon at Canyon Classic in Phoenix, Arizona  L 4-1
March 6, 2021 vs Boise State at Cactus Classic in Tucson, Arizona  L 3-2
March 6, 2021 vs Stephen F. Austin at Cactus Classic in Tucson, Arizona  W 5-0
March 7, 2021 vs Texas A&M Corpus Christi at Cactus Classic in Tucson, Arizona  W 3-2
March 25, 2021 vs # 18 Stanford in Phoenix, Arizona  L 4-1
March 25, 2021 at # 8 Grand Canyon in Phoenix, Arizona  L 4-1
March 27, 2021 vs Washington at Pac-12 South Tournament in Tucson, Arizona  W 4-1
March 27, 2021 vs # 4 UCLA at Pac-12 South Tournament in Tucson, Arizona  L 5-0
March 28, 2021 vs # 18 Stanford at Pac-12 South Tournament in Tucson, Arizona  L 4-1
March 28, 2021 at # 14 Arizona at Pac-12 South Tournament in Tucson, Arizona  L 4-1
April 10, 2021 at # 1 UCLA at Pac-12 North Tournament in Phoenix, Arizona  L 5-0
April 10, 2021 at # 11 California at Pac-12 North Tournament in Phoenix, Arizona  W 3-2
April 11, 2021 at Washington at Pac-12 North Tournament in Phoenix, Arizona  W 3-2
April 11, 2021 at # 2 USC at Pac-12 North Tournament in Phoenix, Arizona  L 5-0
April 16, 2021 at Boise State at Boise State Beach Classic in Boise, Idahoe  W 5-0
April 16, 2021 vs Utah at Boise State Beach Classic in Boise, Idahoe  W 5-0
April 17, 2021 at Boise State at Boise State Beach Classic in Boise, Idahoe  W 4-1
April 22, 2021 vs # 9 Arizona in Phoenix, Arizona  L 4-1
April 29, 2021 at # 8 Arizona at Pac-12 Tournament in Los Angeles, California  L 3-0
April 30, 2021 at Washington at Pac-12 Tournament in Los Angeles, California  W 3-2
April 30, 2021 at # 9 Stanford at Pac-12 Tournament in Los Angeles, California  L 3-1

2022 Season summary
In their sixth season under Head Coach Brad Keenan, the Sun Devils finished the 2022 campaign (17-15) overall.  ASU finished (4-2) at home, (1-4) on the road, (12-9) in neutral site contests, and (2-14) against ranked opponents.  Paul Araiza was an Assistant Coach.  The 2022 roster included: (Taryn Ames, Malina Baker, Katie Blomberg, Lila Bordis, Shane Burleson, Katie Fitzgerald, Cierra Flood, Californiambria Hall, Rylie Kael, Jensen Kaelin, Maria Kowal, Maia Nichols, Anya Pemberton, Maddy Salazar, Lillie Seymour, Lexi Sweeney, Sarah Waters, Ivey Weber, Lauren Weintraub, Kylie Wickley, & Kaitlyn Winkelman).

Awards

2022 Season results
February 25, 2022 vs Boise State at Canyon Classic in Phoenix, Arizona  L 3-2
February 25, 2022 at # 9 Grand Canyon at Canyon Classic in Phoenix, Arizona  L 4-1
March fourth, 2022 vs Colorado Mesa at Cactus Classic in Tucson, Arizona  W 4-1
March fourth, 2022 vs Santa Clara at Cactus Classic in Tucson, Arizona  W 4-1
March fifth, 2022 vs # 9 Hawaii at Cactus Classic in Tucson, Arizona  L 5-0
March fifth, 2022 vs Boise State at Cactus Classic in Tucson, Arizona  W 3-2
March eighth, 2022 vs Benedictine University in Tempe, Arizona  W 5-0
March eighth, 2022 vs # 13 Arizona in Tempe, Arizona  W 3-2
March 11, 2022 vs San Jose State at Cal Poly Tournament in San Luis Obispo, California  W 5-0
March 11, 2022 vs Washington at Cal Poly Tournament in San Luis Obispo, California  W 4-1
March 12, 2022 vs # 6 Loyola Marymount at Cal Poly Tournament in San Luis Obispo, California L 5-0
March 12, 2022 at # 11 Cal Poly at Cal Poly Tournament in San Luis Obispo, California  L 5-0
March 18, 2022 vs Texas A&M Corpus Christi at Fight in the Fort in Fort Worth, Texas  W 4-1
March 18, 2022 at # 3 TCU at Fight in the Forth in Fort Worth, Texas  L 5-0
March 19, 2022 vs Louisiana-Monroe at Fight in the Fort in Fort Worth, Texas  W 5-0
March 19, 2022 vs New Orleans at Fight in the Fort in Fort Worth, Texas  W 3-2
March 24, 2022 vs # 7 Grand Canyon in Tempe, Arizona  L 5-0
March 24, 2022 vs # 8 Stanford in Tempe, Arizona  L 5-0
March 26, 2022 vs # 11 California at Pac-12 South Tournament in Tucson, Arizona  L 5-0
March 26, 2022 vs # 3 USC at Pac-12 South Tournament in Tucson, Arizona  L 4-1
March 27, 2022 vs # 8 Stanford at Pac-12 South Tournament in Tucson, Arizona  L 5-0
March 27, 2022 at # 17 Arizona at Pac-12 South Tournament in Tucson, Arizona  L  3-2
April ninth, 2022 vs Oregon at Pac-12 North Tournament in Palo Alto, California  W 3-2
April ninth, 2022 vs # 3 UCLA at Pac-12 North Tournament in Palo Alto, California  L 5-0
April tenth, 2022 vs Utah at Pac-12 North Tournament in Palo Alto, California  W 5-0
April tenth, 2022 vs Washington at Pac-12 North Tournament in Palo Alto, California  W 3-2
April 15, 2022 vs Ottawa University in Tempe, Arizona  W 5-0
April 15, 2022 vs Park University in Tempe, Arizona  W 4-1
April 27, 2022 vs # 8 Stanford at Pac-12 Tournament in Tucson, Arizona  L 3-0
April 28, 2022 vs Washington at Pac-12 Tournament in Tucson, Arizona  W 3-0
April 28, 2022 at # 17 Arizona at Pac-12 Tournament in Tucson, Arizona  W 3-1
April 29, 2022 vs # 12 California at Pac-12 Tournament in Tucson, Arizona  L 3-0

Home court/practice and training facilities
Completed in February 2022, ASU opened their new Sun Devil Beach Volleyball Facility on the Tempe campus.  It cost $1.2 million and includes four courts.  It's located just East of the Alberta B. Farrington Softball Stadium.

Home matches were originally hosted at the PERA Club, which is located on 1 E. Continental Dr. Tempe, Arizona 85281. The PERA Club (short for Project Employees Recreation Association) is a private country club for employees and families of the Salt River Project, the major water and power utility in Phoenix and surrounding cities. It now holds three volleyball courts after completing major renovations to accommodate the Sun Devil beach volleyball team.

See also
 List of NCAA women's beach volleyball programs

References

https://cfo.asu.edu/sun-devil-beach-volleyball-facility

External links
 

 
Beach volleyball clubs established in 2014
2014 establishments in Arizona